Mark Zakharovich Feygin (born 3 June 1971) is a former Russian lawyer and human rights activist who represented Pussy Riot, Nadiya Savchenko and Leonid Razvozzhayev in Russian courts. He also served from January 1994 to December 1995 as a deputy of the State Duma and was the vice mayor of Samara. In 2011 and 2012, Feygin was active in opposition to President Vladimir Putin, and announced that he was forming an opposition party.  Since the 2022 Russian invasion of Ukraine, he has gained a following on YouTube, hosting daily discussions with Ukrainian presidential advisor Oleksiy Arestovych on his channel.

Biography
In 1995 he graduated from the Law Faculty of the Samara State University. He was one of the leaders of the democratic movement in Samara, co-chairman of the regional organization of the movement Democratic Russia.

In 1993-1996 Feygin served as the Deputy of the State Duma from the fraction of Vybor Rossii, one of the authors and developers of the first edition of the Federal Law About General Principles of Local Government in Russian Federation. In 1995 he took a part in parliamentary groups participated in humanitarian missions during the combat operations in the North Caucasus. In 1996 he was also the editor in chief of the daily newspaper "CHISLA" published in Samara.

In 2000 he graduated from the Institute of Business Administration, Academy of National Economy under the Government of the Russian Federation (Moscow), faculty of "Strategic Management". In 2002 - the Diplomatic Academy of the Russian Foreign Ministry.

Feygin is the author of more than 20 scientific publications in the theme of municipal law and a number of monographs.

Career and notable defense cases
In 2012, Feygin served as one of three lawyers for Pussy Riot, a punk band arrested for an unauthorized performance in Moscow's Cathedral of Christ the Savior. The band's trial became an international cause célèbre during their trial on charges of hooliganism. On 1 October 2012, an appellate hearing was postponed in the Moscow City Court after band member Yekaterina Samutsevich informed a panel of three judges that she wished to terminate the representation of her defense attorneys, stating, "My position in the criminal case does not coincide with their position." Samutsevich's new lawyer, Irina Khrunova, argued that her client had not in fact committed the acts of hooliganism in the church as she was prevented from accessing the soleas by church security. The court appeared to accept this argument, and released Samutsevich on two years probation. However, the judges rejected the appeals of Nadezhda Tolokonnikova and Maria Alyokhina, upholding their convictions and sentences.

On 19 November, Feygin and the two other lawyers for Pussy Riot withdrew from the case prior to Tolokonnikova's appeal, stating that they felt the court would be more likely to grant it if they were no longer a part of the defense. Samutsevich criticized the original legal team for allegedly using the trial for personal publicity rather than securing the release of the defendants. On 21 November, Samutsevich's lawyer told the press that Samutsevich was considering requesting that Feygin and the other original lawyers be disbarred for failing to return her passport and other belongings. Feygin responded via Twitter that Samutsevich was part of a "defamation campaign organized by the authorities", while another member of the legal team, Violeta Volkova, responded that the claims were "part of an agreement that allowed her to break free of the case". On 21 January 2013, Feygin, Volkova, and Nikolay Polozov filed suit against Khrunova and Kommersant for defamation. This suit was rejected by the Tverskoi District Court on 20 August 2013.

Feygin also defended Leonid Razvozzhayev, an opposition political aide who accused Russian authorities of having kidnapped him from Kyiv, Ukraine to face terrorism charges.

Since 11 June 2014, Feygin also defended Nadiya Savchenko, a Ukrainian air-force pilot who was captured by pro-Russian insurgents during the 2014 insurgency in Donbass (in eastern Ukraine) and who was detained in Russia and charged with the killing of two Russian journalists.

On 24 April 2018, the Moscow Chamber of Lawyers stripped Mark Feygin of his attorney status, purportedly for his comments on Twitter about Anatoly Shariy and his lawyer.

References 

1971 births
Living people
First convocation members of the State Duma (Russian Federation)
Politicians from Samara, Russia
Lawyers from Moscow
Jewish Russian politicians
Solidarnost politicians
21st-century Russian politicians
People listed in Russia as media foreign agents
Russian activists against the 2022 Russian invasion of Ukraine
Russian YouTubers
Samara State University alumni